Ransbach-Baumbach is a Verbandsgemeinde ("collective municipality") in the district Westerwaldkreis, in Rhineland-Palatinate, Germany. The seat of the Verbandsgemeinde is in Ransbach-Baumbach.

The Verbandsgemeinde Ransbach-Baumbach consists of the following Ortsgemeinden ("local municipalities"):

 Alsbach 
 Breitenau 
 Caan 
 Deesen 
 Hundsdorf 
 Nauort 
 Oberhaid 
 Ransbach-Baumbach
 Sessenbach 
 Wirscheid 
 Wittgert

Verbandsgemeinde in Rhineland-Palatinate